The Australia national rugby union team, nicknamed the Wallabies, is the representative national team in the sport of rugby union for the nation of Australia. The team first played at Sydney in 1899, winning their first test match against the touring British Isles team.

Australia have competed in all nine Rugby World Cups, winning the final on two occasions and also finishing as runner-up twice. Australia beat England at Twickenham in the final of the 1991 Rugby World Cup and won again in 1999 at the Millennium Stadium in Cardiff when their opponents in the final were France.

The Wallabies also compete annually in The Rugby Championship (formerly the Tri-Nations), along with southern hemisphere counterparts Argentina, New Zealand and South Africa. They have won this championship on four occasions. Australia also plays Test matches against the various rugby-playing nations.

More than a dozen former Wallabies players have been inducted into the World Rugby Hall of Fame.

History

Early years

Australia's first international match was played against the touring British Isles team in 1899. The first Test was played at the Sydney Cricket Ground and won 13–3 by Australia, but the tourists won the remaining three Tests. The Australian team for the first match consisted of six players from Queensland and nine from New South Wales. The team wore the blue of New South Wales when playing in Sydney and the maroon of Queensland when playing in Brisbane, but with an Australian Coat of Arms in place of the usual emblems of each colony.

This tour improved rugby's popularity in Sydney and Brisbane and helped to boost club match attendances.

In 1907 the New South Wales Rugby League was formed and star player Dally Messenger left rugby union for the rival code. The next year the first Australian rugby team to tour the British Isles left Sydney. Newspapers in England initially gave the team the name 'Rabbits'. The Australian players thought this nickname derogatory and replaced it with 'Wallabies'.

In 1909, when the new "Northern Union" code was still in its infancy in Australia, a match between the Kangaroos and the Wallabies was played before a crowd of around 20,000, with the Rugby League side winning 29–26.

The First World War had a very negative effect on rugby union in Australia. All rugby union competitions in New South Wales and Queensland ceased after the state bodies decided it was inappropriate to play football when so many young men were fighting overseas. The sport of rugby union was all but closed down causing many players to switch to rugby league – which did not cease playing during the war.

In Queensland regular competitions did not commence again until 1929, and there was no official Australian team selected through most of the 1920s before the 1929 All Blacks tour. The New South Wales Waratahs were re-formed in 1920, however, and played regularly throughout the decade including a series of matches against New Zealand and  before their 1927–28 tour of the British Isles, France and Canada. Because these Waratahs teams were Australia's only representatives at the time, all international matches they played during this period were accorded retrospective Wallaby status.

War hero Sir Edward "Weary" Dunlop also played for Australia before World War II. He played on the side that was the first to win the Bledisloe Cup.

Post-war: 1946–1959
The first Test to following World War Two was played at Carisbrook, Dunedin between Australia and New Zealand in 1946, which New Zealand won 31–8. Australia did not win on the three match tour; beaten 20–0 by New Zealand Maori, and then losing 14–10 to the All Blacks the following week. Australia embarked on a tour of the home nations in 1947–48. The successful tour fell short of an undefeated run when the Australians lost to France in their last match, in Paris. Players on the rise included Trevor Allan, Cyril Burke and Nicholas Shehadie.

After returning from the successful European tour, Australia hosted the New Zealand Maori in a three match series in 1949; both sides winning once, with one draw. In September of that year, Australia played the All Blacks twice in New Zealand, winning both games and taking back the Bledisloe Cup for the first time on New Zealand soil. The 'Number 1' All Black side was touring South Africa at the time and the wins by Australia against the B-team have sometimes been downgraded. However, in deference to the apartheid system then in operation in South Africa, the NZRU did not select any Maori players for the tour. Many of those regular All Black Maori played against Australia instead and it could be said that the New Zealand team that played Australia was at least as good as the one on tour in South Africa. The British Isles toured Australia in 1950, and won both of the Tests against Australia. The following year Australia fell to a three Test whitewash to the All Blacks. Australia won in July 1952, defeating  at the Sydney Cricket Ground – they then lost the second Test to Fiji by two points. Australia managed to beat the All Blacks at Lancaster Park after the Fijian series; however they lost the second Test.

On this tour they also drew against Rhodesia in Kitwe 8–8.

1960s
The first match of the new decade was the win over Fiji at the SCG in the first match of a three Test series during 1961. This was followed by a second win, but Fiji grabbed a draw in the third Test. Australia then headed to South Africa, where they lost to the Springboks in Port Elizabeth and Johannesburg. After returning home, they faced France at the SCG, who beat them 15–8.

In 1962, Australia played the All Blacks five times and lost all but a 9–9 draw at Athletic Park. After defeating  18–9 in 1963 in Sydney, Australia beat the Springboks in consecutive Tests in South Africa; the first team to do so since the 1896 British team.

Fewer tests were played throughout the mid-1960s, with Australia only playing a three Test series against All Blacks in 1964. They won the third Test after losing the first two. The following year Australia hosted the Springboks for two Tests, winning 18–11 and 12–8. This was their first ever series win over South Africa and first over a major nation since 1934.

The British Isles came the following year, beating Australia 11–8 at the SCG, before hammering them 31–0 in Brisbane. Australia left for Europe in that December where a 14–11 victory over Wales was followed by a slim 11–5 defeat of Scotland. The tour continued into the following year where Australia beat England 23–11 before losing to Ireland 15–8 and France 20–14. Australia then hosted Ireland, who beat them again in Sydney. This was followed by a 20-point loss to the All Blacks. The following year, Australia lost to the All Blacks by just one point after a dubious penalty try. Later that year they defeated France for the first time by the same margin from a long drop goal by John Ballesty for their last win of the decade. After losing to Ireland and Scotland on tour, Australia hosted Wales who also beat them.

1970s
Australia played Scotland in 1970 and won by 20 points. The 1971 South African tour of Australia took place the next season. Protests were held around Australia and in Queensland a state of emergency was issued in advance of one of the Tests. Australia toured France in November of that year; defeating France in Toulouse, but losing the second Test in Paris. France then visited Australia in June 1972 and played a two Test series where they won one and drew one. Australia then played three Test series against the All Blacks in New Zealand—losing all three. They then stopped over in Suva to play Fiji on their return, where they won their only Test of the year.

The following year, Australia hosted Tonga, and after winning the first Test, they lost 11–16 at Ballymore in their second. Australia also had a short tour of the United Kingdom in November 1973 where they lost 24–0 to Wales, and 20–3 to England. In 1974, Australia hosted the All Blacks for a three Test series—losing two, but drawing in Brisbane.

In 1974, former Wallaby Dick Marks was appointed as the inaugural National Director of Coaching, commencing a period of systematic improvement of Australian rugby coach and player development under the National Coaching Scheme. A turn around in performance of the national side soon followed, leading to outstanding international successes through the 1980s and 1990s.

In 1975 Australia defeated England in a two Test series at home. Australia then played Japan for the first time; beating them by 30 points in the first of two matches, and then winning 50–25 in the second. They then travelled to the Northern hemisphere for matches against Scotland and Wales where they were not able to score a try in either of their losses. The tour of Britain and Ireland continued into 1976, and Australia lost to England at Twickenham, but were able to defeat Ireland at Lansdowne Road. On their way home Australia played one more match—in Los Angeles against the United States. Australia won 24–12. In June of that year, Australia hosted Fiji for a three Test series and won all three. Australia finished the year with their tour of Europe where the team played two Tests against France in France, but lost both of them. There were no Wallaby tests played in 1977.

Wales toured Australia in 1978, and Australia beat them 18–8 at Ballymore, and then again by two points at the SCG. This was followed by a three match series with the All Blacks. Although New Zealand won the first two, Australia defeated them in the last Test at Eden Park with Greg Cornelsen scoring four tries. The following year Ireland visited Australia and defeated Australia in two Tests. Following this Australia hosted the All Blacks for a single Test at the SCG which Australia won 12–6. Australia then left for Argentina for two Tests. After going down 24–13 in the first, Australia finished the decade by beating Argentina 17–12 in Buenos Aires.

1980s
In 1980 Australia won the Bledisloe Cup for only the fourth time—defeating New Zealand 2–1 in a three match series in Australia. This was the start of a successful era for Australia. In 1984 Australia toured the Home nations with a young side and new coach Alan Jones. The 1984 Wallabies became the first team from Australia to achieve a Grand Slam by defeating all four Home Nations: England, Ireland, Wales and Scotland, and a strong Barbarians side. The tour signalled the emergence of Australia as a serious force on the world stage. Many records were established on the tour including; 100 points being scored in the four Tests—the most scored by a touring team to the United Kingdom and Ireland, the first ever push-over try conceded by Wales in Cardiff, Mark Ella scoring a try in each match – a feat never before achieved.

In 1986 Australia toured New Zealand in a three match series for the Bledisloe Cup. New Zealand rugby was in turmoil as an unofficial team named The Cavaliers that contained the bulk of the All Blacks players toured South Africa. On return those All Blacks who had toured with The Cavaliers were banned from selection for the first Bledisloe Test. Australia went on to win the first match by 13–12. The ban on players was lifted for the second Test which was played on 23 August 1986 at Carisbrook. New Zealand squared the series 1–1 by winning the match 13–12. The match included controversy when Welsh referee Derek Bevan disallowed a try by Australia number eight Steve Tuynman. The final match was played on 6 September 1986 at Eden Park. Australia beat a full strength New Zealand team 22–9 to secure their first series win on New Zealand soil.

Australia went into the inaugural Rugby World Cup in 1987 confident. However, the semi-final against France at Sydney's Concord Oval, was lost 30–26. Australia then lost the 3rd/4th play-off match against Wales. While Australia's performances over the three years under coach Alan Jones were of a high standard, Jones had a polarising effect on the team with many players unhappy with his management style. Mark Ella, who retired after the 1984 season, stated that he might not have retired had Jones not been coach. Notably, there were deep ructions between coach Alan Jones and influential half-back Nick Farr-Jones. Before and during the 1987 World Cup Alan Jones increased his activities outside coaching Australia, including radio broadcasting. Following the World Cup Jones was removed as coach and Bob Dwyer—who had coached Australia in 1982 and 1983—returned to coach in 1988.

In 1989 the British Lions toured Australia for the first time since 1966. After winning the first Test, Australia lost the second and third matches to lose the series 2–1. Bob Dwyer identified a lack of forward dominance as a major factor contributing to the loss and entered the 1990s with an aim to improve this facet of the Wallaby game.

John Moulton was the Wallabies team doctor during the 1986 Bledisloe Cup win in New Zealand and the Rugby World Cup in 1987 and the Rugby World Cup victory in 1991.

1990s
The team regrouped and then went into the 1991 World Cup with a renewed attitude. In the pool games they beat Argentina, cruised to a 38–3 win over Wales, and beat Samoa 9–3 in a rain soaked game. During the quarter-final match against Ireland, Australia were never able to pull away from them. With literally seconds remaining on the clock, Ireland were up 18–15 before Michael Lynagh scored in the corner to break the hearts of the Irish and qualify for the semi-final against New Zealand. In the first half they raced to a 13–3 lead and then showed they could defend as the All Blacks pounded their line. They faced England in the final at Twickenham. England changed their usually forward-dominated game plan and attempted to play more of a running game. It was unsuccessful and Australia battled out a 12–6 win. David Campese was named player of the tournament having scored six tries in a series of outstanding performances. Victory parades were held back in Australia for their national team.

The decade was one of the most important in the creation of the modern game. Australia's defence of the World Cup in South Africa in 1995 opened with defeat by the home side. Pool play was followed by an exit in the quarter-final against England courtesy of a long-range drop-goal from the boot of Rob Andrew. This was Australia's worst ever World Cup result, on a par with Australia's unexpected exit from the 2007 campaign at the quarter-final stage, also against England. The Tri-Nations and Super 12 tournaments were established that year, and started in 1996. This pushed the game into professionalism. In response to rugby's move to professionalism, the Rugby Union Players Association (RUPA) was established in October 1995 to safeguard the interests of Australia's professional rugby players.

Greg Smith was national coach in 1996 and 1997 when Australia only won two of their eight Tri-Nations Tests, both over South Africa in Australia, and suffered record-margin Test defeats by the All Blacks and Springboks. Rod Macqueen was appointed as Smith's successor and in 1998 Australia won both their Tests over the All Blacks to gain the Bledisloe Cup. They retained the Bledisloe in 1999 when they defeated the All Blacks by a record 28–7 in Sydney.

In the 1999 World Cup Australia won their pool and conceded only 31 points before facing Wales in their quarter-final. They won 24–9 before winning the semi-final 27–21 against defending champions South Africa. The semi-final was won after a memorable drop goal in extra time by fly-half Stephen Larkham (his first drop goal scored in a Test match). The final against France at Millennium Stadium was easily won by 35–12; with the majority of points courtesy of fullback and goal-kicker Matt Burke.

In 1999, five Australian players won their second Rugby World Cup: Phil Kearns, John Eales, Tim Horan, Jason Little and Dan Crowley.

2000s

In 2000 Australia retained the Bledisloe Cup, and won the Tri Nations for the first time. They repeated this in 2001 and also achieved their first ever series win over the British & Irish Lions. MacQueen, and captain John Eales both retired soon after this. They were replaced by coach Eddie Jones and captain George Gregan. This period also saw big-money signings of top-level rugby league footballers Mat Rogers, Wendell Sailor, and Lote Tuqiri—all of whom went on to represent Australia. This was a contrast to much of the previous century where many Rugby union players were lured to league with large salaries.

After not retaining the Tri-Nations in 2002, and losing the Bledisloe Cup in 2003 Australia made a strong start to their 2003 World Cup campaign with a 24–8 win over Argentina, and two large victories over Namibia and Romania. They then narrowly defeated Ireland 17–16 and Scotland 33–16, in the quarter-final. They claimed one of their greatest victories over New Zealand when they upset them in the semi-final winning 22–10, prompting George Gregan to taunt the New Zealanders with the words "Four more years boys, four more years". They played England in a thrilling final and were finally beaten after England's Jonny Wilkinson kicked a drop goal in extra time.

In 2005 to celebrate the ten-year anniversary of the professionalism of rugby union the Wallaby Team of the Decade was announced. John Eales being named captain by a selection panel of 30. Following the 2005 European tour, media outlets such as the Daily Telegraph called for the sacking of both Eddie Jones and George Gregan. Former coach Alan Jones also called for their sacking. The record of eight losses from their last nine Tests resulted in Jones being fired by the Australian Rugby Union.

John Connolly was named as the head coach of Australia in early 2006. Australia won both of two Tests against England in 2006, as well as a subsequent win over Ireland. Australia lost by 20 points in their opening Tri-Nations fixture against the All Blacks. They then beat South Africa in Brisbane by 49–0. They won one of their remaining four matches of the tournament. Following defeat by England in the quarter-finals of the 2007 Rugby World Cup, Connolly announced he was resigning as head coach.

Robbie Deans was appointed head coach in early 2008 as the Wallabies began their preparations for the 2008 Tri-Nations series. After the retirement of George Gregan and Stephen Larkham after the 2007 Rugby World Cup, Deans had the task of choosing a squad minus some of its most experienced players. The Wallabies had mixed results in the 2008 Tri Nations Series, defeating New Zealand in Sydney and beating South Africa twice, in both Perth and Durban. However, the Wallabies suffered the worst defeat in their history, going down 53–8 to South Africa in Johannesburg.

2009 was not a good year for the Wallabies. It went downhill from there as they finished 3rd in the Tri Nations with three losses to the All Blacks (22–16, 19–18 and 33–6) and two losses to the World Champion Springboks (29–17 and 32–25). Their only win in the Tri Nations was a 21–6 win over South Africa. In the Autumn Internationals of 2009, they lost to New Zealand 32–19, they beat England 18–9 on Jonny Wilkinson's return in the English jersey. The Wallabies then drew with Ireland 20–20 after Brian O'Driscoll's last minute try to give Ronan O'Gara a relatively easy conversion to draw level. They then lost to Scotland for the first time in 27 years. The final score was 9–8 despite the 3–3 score at half time. The Wallabies only won 7 out of their 14 games in 2009 but were still ranked 3rd in the world.

2010s

2010 saw improved results in the Tri Nations series, with a very rare away win against  awarding Australia the Mandela Plate and ensuring they retained second place both in the 2010 Tri Nations competition as well as the IRB World Rankings. Later that year however, Australia finally beat the All Blacks in a thrilling game that was played in Hong Kong. It was their first win against New Zealand in close to three years. However they suffered losses against  and Munster on their end of year European tour.

They however failed the following season in their attempt to win the expanded version of the competition in 2012 called The Rugby Championship.

Australia also won their first match against  in the 2011 Rugby World Cup, but lost their second 2011 World Cup match, 6–15 against . Injuries to crucial players Digby Ioane and Stephen Moore influenced the results, alongside poor line-out throwing. The Wallabies won their last pool match against , 68–22. The Wallabies beat the Springboks 11–9 to progress into the semi-finals. However a week later the Wallabies were knocked out of the 2011 World Cup after being defeated 6–20 by the All Blacks in the second semi-final match. They then faced  in the bronze medal final, narrowly winning 18–21.

Following the Wallabies' defeat to the British & Irish Lions in their 2013 tour, and with a winning rate of 58.1%, a poor 3–15 record against the All Blacks, Deans came under increasing pressure to keep his coaching position.
Deans resigned in July 2013, ending his six-year tenure as head coach of the Wallabies. During his tenure, Deans coached the Wallabies on 74 occasions winning 43 times, losing 29 and drawing twice. He had won just three times against their main rivals, the All Blacks, with one draw in 2012. However, he left with a good record against the Springboks, with 9 wins from 14. Highlights during his tenure as coach included leading the Wallabies to a Tri Nations championship in 2011 and to a 3rd-place finish in the 2011 Rugby World Cup.

On 9 July 2013, Queensland Reds coach Ewen McKenzie was officially named Wallabies coach to replace Robbie Deans.
McKenzie's first match in charge was a 47–29 loss to New Zealand in the opening fixture of the 2013 Rugby Championship. In this match he gave five debutants their first cap. The 27–16 loss a week later, meant the Bledisloe Cup would stay with New Zealand for the 11th year in a row. In addition to this, McKenzie led to team to a 38–12 loss to South Africa, the biggest ever winning margin by South Africa over Australia in Australia. Australia's poor form in the Championship continued against South Africa, where Australia lost 28–8 in Cape Town. However, Australia's final fixture of the Championship saw the Wallabies earn their first bonus point win in the Championship and saw them score the most points in either the Rugby Championship / Tri Nations. During the Championship, McKenzie made several bold moves as a coach. He dropped star player Will Genia for Nic White, who at the time had only three caps, and named Ben Mowen as captain in his first year as a test player.

During the Bledisloe 3, New Zealand won 41–33 to win the Bledisloe series 3–0. During their 2013 end of year tour, McKenzie led the team to four consecutive wins (50–20 win over Italy, 32–15 win over Ireland, 21–15 win over Scotland and a 30–26 win over Wales) which was the first time Australia has done this since 2008. But Australia lost 20–13 to England in the opening match of the tour. However, during the tour Australia did retain the Lansdowne Cup, reclaimed the Hopetoun Cup and claimed the James Bevan Trophy for the 6th time in a row.

In 2014, their four consecutive wins were increased to seven for the first time since 2000. They earned a 3–0 test series win over  during the June International Window, which included a 50–23 win in Brisbane, a 6–0 win in Melbourne and a 39–13 win in Sydney. The series win meant Australia reclaimed the Trophée des Bicentenaires for the first time since 2010, after losing it in 2012. The Wallabies' unbeaten run stretched to eight matches with a 12–12 draw with New Zealand, prompting optimism that Australia could finally reclaim the Bledisloe Cup for the first time since 2002, in addition to ending their 28-year winless run at Eden Park. However, Australia came crashing back to earth, suffering a 51–20 defeat during the second Bledisloe test, staged at the venue, stretching Australia's Bledisloe Cup drought to a 12th year. Australia managed to bounce back from that defeat, with hard fought 24–23 and 32–25 wins over South Africa and Argentina, with the latter win ensuring that Australia retained the Puma Trophy. However, Australia was unable to reclaim the Mandela Challenge Plate, suffering a 28–11 loss to South Africa, after conceding three tries and a drop goal in the final 11 minutes of the match. A week later, Australia suffered a 21–17 loss to Argentina, their first loss to Argentina in 17 years. This loss meant that Australia became the first country to lose to Argentina in the Rugby Championship since Argentina's admittance in 2012. For the second consecutive year, Australia finished in third place in the Rugby Championship. On 18 October 2014, McKenzie resigned as the head coach of Australia. He left the Wallabies with 11 wins in 22 tests coached, for a winning percentage of just 50%. McKenzie left with a good winning record against European opposition, winning seven of eight tests played, the sole loss coming against England in November 2013. He also left with a good winning record against Argentina, with a 3–1 win–loss record. However, he left with a poor record against Rugby Championship opponents, failing to win a match against New Zealand and leaving with a 1–3 win–loss record against South Africa. On 22 October 2014, New South Wales Waratahs head coach Michael Cheika was appointed the new head coach of Australia, becoming Australia's third head coach in two years. In his first match as coach of Australia, Australia defeated the Barbarians 40–36 at Twickenham Stadium. On the 2014 end of year tour, Australia defeated Wales at the Millennium Stadium in Cardiff 33–28, delivering the Wallabies a 10th straight victory over the hosts in Michael Cheika's first Test as coach. The Wallabies, though, were outscored by four tries to three, with fly-half Bernard Foley kicking a late drop goal and three second-half penalties. The Wallabies lost the other three test matches on the tour against France, Ireland and England which dropped them to sixth place on the world rankings.

2015 was a good year for the Wallabies, they won the Rugby Championship defeating South Africa (24-20), Argentina (9-34) and New Zealand (27-19). They failed to claim the Bledisloe Cup, however losing to their Trans-Tasman rivals the following week in Auckland 41-13. Then it was time for the Rugby World Cup. Australia was in "the pool of death" alongside Wales, Fiji, England and Uruguay. The Wallabies first match was against Fiji which Australia won 28–13. Then Australia slaughtered Uruguay 65–3. In the third round Australia defeated England at Twickenham 33–13, eliminating the host nation from their own World Cup. In the last pool match Australia luckily defeated Wales 15–6. In the quarter-finals they scraped a "controversial" win over Scotland by 35–34. They then defeated Argentina in the semi-finals which took them to the Grand Final against New Zealand, which they lost 34–17.

2016 went badly for the Wallabies, the beginning of a severe downward trend in their results. In June the Australians hosted a three-test series against Six Nations winners England, coached by former Wallabies overseer Eddie Jones. England won all three games, by 39–28, 23–7 and 44–40 respectively. Although they finally finished in 2nd place, with two wins over Argentina and one over South Africa, they lost both games against New Zealand in the Rugby Championship plus the third Bledisloe test that year, continuing a miserable run against their trans-Tasman rivals. In the end of year internationals, Australia managed wins against Wales (32–8), Scotland (23–22) and France (25–23), but lost to Ireland 27–24 before losing a fourth game against England by 37–21.
Kll
2017 saw little improvement. In the 2017 June internationals Australia secured wins against Fiji (37–14) and Italy (40–27), but lost against a Scotland side missing a number of players on duty for the British & Irish Lions. Their form continued into the 2017 Rugby Championship where, despite again finishing 2nd in the table, they only won their two games against Argentina, lost both matches against New Zealand and struggled to two draws against a poor South Africa. Although they pulled off a surprise 23–18 win in the third Bledisloe test that year, in their autumn test season they only achieved wins against Japan (63–30) and Wales (29–21) before suffering a fifth straight defeat to England 30–6 and a crushing, record-setting loss to Scotland by 53–24.

2018 was one of the worst years ever for Australian rugby. In the June series against Ireland, Australia won the first test 18–9, but lost the remaining matches 21–26 and 20–16 despite outscoring the Six Nations Grand Slam holders by five tries to three. The home series loss to Ireland was Australia's first since 1979. In that year's Rugby Championship Australia again lost both matches against arch-rivals New Zealand. Although they secured a hard-fought 23–18 victory against South Africa in Round 2, they subsequently lost to Argentina at home for the first time since 1983, as well as the return fixture to South Africa 23–12. Their third win of the year was against Argentina where, despite losing the first half 31–7, the Wallabies pulled off an astonishing second-half comeback to win the match 45–34. In the final Bledisloe test, played at Yokohama stadium in Japan, the Wallabies were again trounced by New Zealand 37–20. That autumn, Australia suffered their first defeat to Wales in 10 years by 9–6. The scoreline of the Welsh game, as well as the result, exactly mirrored that of the first meeting between the sides 110 years earlier. They defeated Italy 26–7 the following week, before falling to a sixth defeat in a row to England by 37–18 the week after. The Wallabies finished 2018 having won only four games from thirteen tests played, marking that year as their direst run of results in the professional era, and their worst calendar year since 1958.

2019 saw some improvement from the previous year. Despite losing to South Africa 35-17 in Johannesburg, they defeated Argentina 16-10, and then Australia surprised New Zealand with a thumping 47–26 win in Perth, equalling the largest margin of defeat for the All Blacks in a test match, tied with Australia's 28–7 victory in 1999. New Zealand reversed the result in the return match in Auckland, however, with a comprehensive 36–0 win to retain the Bledisloe Cup. At the 2019 Rugby World Cup Australia won three of their four pool matches, but a close loss to Wales led to a quarter-final fixture with England. Yet another defeat to the English, by 40–16, ended the Australian campaign and the following day Cheika announced that he would resign as head coach by the end of the year. His contract had been due to expire following the World Cup. The Wallabies ended the decade placed 6th in the international rankings, a fall of 3 places from the beginning of the 2010s.

2020s 
2020 saw mixed results. Cheika was replaced by Dave Rennie as head coach and due to the COVID-19 pandemic the 2020 Super Rugby season was suspended after only 1 month of playing. This forced the cancellation of many fixtures against northern hemisphere teams, limiting Australia to playing New Zealand and Argentina in a reverted Tri-Nations outfit. In the first match of the Bledisloe Cup in Wellington, Australia tied 16–16 with New Zealand, the closest they had come to winning a match in New Zealand for 20 years. Critics praised Rennie for his replacement of departed players such as Will Genia and Kurtley Beale. However, they criticised utility back Reece Hodge for missing a 50-metre penalty goal to win the match. In the second match, New Zealand played a tougher game, with Australia having to try to break their 35-year drought at Eden Park. They were outclassed 27-7 despite being 3 points down at halftime. The third leg played in Sydney was a horror match, with the Wallabies going down 43–5 to the Kiwis, a record loss and the largest win in Bledisloe Cup history. Australia next played New Zealand at Suncorp Stadium in Brisbane, where they finally notched a 24–22 win, thanks to debutant winger Tom Wright scoring in the first 10 minutes. They next played Argentina, where they drew 15-all and Hodge once again missed a penalty goal to seal the match. They played the Los Pumas once more, and the result was the same result as Wellington, a 16-all draw. The Wallabies finished 2020 by bumping up to sixth in the world rankings behind Ireland.

2021 brought both highs and lows. The July internationals series saw France touring Australia, and as Sydney went into lockdown due to the COVID-19 pandemic, the first 2021 test was rescheduled to be played at Suncorp Stadium. The Wallabies opened with a 23—21 win, leapfrogging both France and Wales up to fifth in the world rankings, and the Les Bleus responded with a 28—26 win at AAMI Park in Melbourne, their first win in Australia since 1990. Play returned to Suncorp Stadium for the decider with the cumulative scores of the first two games 49—49. With 5 minutes remaining and the scores tied at 30-all, the series was on a knife's edge, but the final points were notched up with a penalty kick by Noah Lolesio, giving a 33—30 win and series win to the Wallabies. The massive challenge of back-to-back games at Eden Park for the Bledisloe Cup brought two losses, 25—33 for the first game, and a heavy 22—57 defeat in the opening Rugby Championship match. With New Zealand having already secured the cup for the 19th consecutive year, the All Blacks remained undefeated in the 2021 Bledisloe series as the Wallabies again went down 21—38 in Perth. However, things started to improve for the Wallabies for the rest of the Rugby Championship. Quade Cooper made a much-anticipated return to the Wallabies against South Africa at fly-half and produced a stellar performance, leading the Wallabies to a 28—26 win after kicking 8 from 8 off the tee. Australia followed this up with an even more convincing 30—17 win over the Springboks, launching them to third in world rankings behind the world champions South Africa, and New Zealand. Back-to-back wins against Argentina put the Wallabies second on the final table behind the All Blacks, with 4 consecutive wins in the Rugby Championship for the first time ever. During the Spring Tour, the Wallabies called up Tolu Latu, Will Skelton and Rory Arnold to help boost their forward pack. A surprise addition was Kurtley Beale, who was called in after an injury to Reece Hodge. Though the Wallabies won against Japan, they lost all their games in Britain, with close losses against Scotland and Wales, and a comprehensive defeat to England. This was the first time in 45 years that the Wallabies lost all games in a European tour. Australia finished the tour by falling to sixth in the world rankings, from a mid-year high of third in the world.

2022 was a hard year for the Wallabies. In the July test series against England, they won the opening game in Perth 30-28, their first victory against the English since 2015, but went on to lose the series losing 17-25 in Brisbane and 17-21 in Sydney. In their opening Rugby Championship match against Argentina, they were down 16-10 at halftime but made an astonishing comeback to win 26-41 in Mendoza, only for them to get thumped by the Pumas 48-17 the next week. They then dominated the Springboks 25-17 in Adelaide, but got stunned the next week in Sydney by the Boks (8-24) Then, in September 2022, the Wallabies dropped to their lowest-ever World Rugby ranking after losing to the All Blacks in Melbourne. The team fell to ninth on World Rugby's rankings ladder. They sunk even lower after losing 40-14 to the All Blacks at Eden Park. The Wallabies then managed a close win against Scotland at Murrayfield (15-16), but went on to lose to France (30-29), a stunning loss to Italy (28-27) and to world no. 1 Ireland (13-10). The Wallabies were down 34-13 to Wales after 58 minutes of their last game of the season, but pulled off an amazing comeback to finish a woeful season on a high (34-39)

Jersey 

The Wallabies play in Australia's traditional sporting colours of green and gold. Before there was a national jersey in place, the Wallabies would play in the jersey of the state the game was being held. The Australian Coat of Arms would often replace the state logo on the jersey, and a variety of these colours were used in a number of matches in the early 1900s.

During their first years, the colours of the Wallabies changed depending on the place where they played. Between 1899 and 1904, the team wore sky blue jersey in Sydney and maroon during their games in Brisbane. During 1905–07, their switched to a maroon and light blue striped shirt, then returning to the sky blue (1908–1928). In 1928 governing bodies agreed that "the Australian amateur representative colours of green and gold, should be adopted". The following year the All Blacks came to Australia, and the jersey worn was emerald green with the Australian Coat of Arms; with green socks with bars on the top. The jersey remained mainly the same, with a few variations, throughout the 1930s. In the 1961 tour of South Africa, Australia wore the gold and green jersey for the first time, to avoid confusion with the Springboks colors.

The away jersey usually is green or white, although in the 1995 Rugby World Cup, the Wallabies wore in the match against Romania a green and gold hooped jersey, with green shorts and socks.

Canterbury's design for Australia's 2007 World cup jersey was controversial, featuring a curved tan-coloured panel across the chest resembling the shape of a bra. This led the Sydney Morning Herald's chief rugby correspondent to include a satirical piece in his column comparing it to Kramer and Frank Costanza's infamous man bra from Seinfeld.

In 2010, KooGa became the apparel sponsor. The first KooGa jersey for the Wallabies under KooGa was used from 2010 through to the conclusion of the 2012 season, however, a different set of shorts and socks were made for the 2012 season. A new kit designed by KooGa was revealed in 2013 for the series against the British & Irish Lions. BLK Sport, previously the Australian subdivision of KooGa, became the apparel sponsor after that tour, with the BLK logo replacing the KooGa logo on the kit for the 2013 Spring Tour.

In October 2013, the ARU announced that Asics would be the apparel sponsor beginning in 2014. In the third 2017 Bledisloe Cup test, for the first time, the Wallabies played with an indigenous jersey. Cadbury became the major sponsor of the Wallabies in 2021, replacing Qantas as the front of jersey sponsor.

Notes

Nickname and mascot

The nickname "Wallabies" is in reference to the wallaby—a marsupial that is widely distributed throughout Australia. The name has its origins during first United Kingdom and North America tour by the Australian team in 1908. New Zealand had just completed a tour and the English press dubbed their team the "All Blacks". It was suggested that Australia should too have a nickname, and Rabbits was one of the names suggested by the English newspapers. The Australians rejected this, and did not want the national team to be represented by an imported pest. They opted for the native Wallaby instead. At first it was only touring parties that were nicknamed the Wallabies; when Australia played domestically, they were referred to as internationals.

The team mascot is known as Wally. The Wallabies Nunataks are named for the team.

Record

When the World Rankings were introduced in 2003, Australia was ranked fourth. Since then, the highest ranking Australia has achieved is second, and the lowest is ninth.

Rugby World Cup

Australia has appeared at every Rugby World Cup since the first tournament in 1987. Australia was the first nation to win two World Cups, with victories in 1991 and 1999. They have progressed to four Rugby Union World Cup finals, a record jointly held with New Zealand and England.

In 1987, Australia co-hosted the inaugural Rugby World Cup with New Zealand. They were grouped with England, the United States and Japan in Pool A. In their first ever World Cup match, Australia defeated England 19–6 at Concord Oval in Sydney then went on to beat their other pool opponents to finish the top of their group and advance to the quarter-finals where they defeated Ireland 33–15. They were knocked out by France in the semi-finals, and then lost the third place match against Wales.

Coached by Bob Dwyer for the 1991 World Cup in Europe, Australia again finished at the top of their pool, defeating Western Samoa, Wales and Argentina during the group stages. They met Ireland in the quarter-finals, beating them by one point to go through to the semi-finals, where they defeated the All Blacks 16–6 to qualify for their first World Cup final. Australia beat England 12–6 at Twickenham in the 1991 Rugby World Cup Final to become world champions.

Australia were again automatically qualified for the 1995 World Cup in South Africa and finished second in their pool, losing one game to hosts South Africa. They were then knocked out in the quarter-finals by England. In the 2009 feature film Invictus based on the story of the 1995 tournament, Australia can be seen playing South Africa in one of the scenes.

Rod Macqueen was the Australian head coach for the 1999 World Cup in Wales. The team beat Ireland, Romania and the United States during the group stages and, after defeated hosts Wales in the quarter-finals, they turned the tables on defending champions South Africa, beating them 27–21 to make it to the final. There they defeated France 35 to 12, in the 1999 Rugby World Cup Final and becoming the first nation to win the World Cup twice.

Australia were the sole hosts of the tournament in 2003, and went undefeated in Pool A, beating Ireland, Argentina, Romania and Namibia. Australia defeated Scotland in the quarter-finals, and then the All Blacks in what was regarded as an upset in the semi-finals, to go to the final. England won the final in Sydney during extra time with a Jonny Wilkinson drop goal.

The 2007 World Cup in France was not a successful tournament for the Wallabies. While they finished on top of their group in the pool stages, Australia was knocked out by England 12–10 in their quarter-final, again largely due to Jonny Wilkinson's goal-kicking prowess. This loss was widely regarded as an upset, given England had only finished 2nd in their pool and were ranked 7th. Nevertheless, England went on to upset hosts France in their semi-final match, and advanced to the final where they were beaten by South Africa.

Rugby Championship
Australia's main annual tournament is The Rugby Championship (formerly the Tri-Nations from 1996 to 2011), competing with New Zealand, South Africa and Argentina who joined in 2012. Australia has won the tournament four times; in 2000, 2001, 2011 and 2015. Within the Rugby Championship, Australia also competes for the Bledisloe Cup with New Zealand, the Mandela Challenge Plate with South Africa, and the Puma Trophy with Argentina.

Series played

Overall
Australia contests a number of other trophies against tier one teams from the Northern Hemisphere. The Trophée des Bicentenaires has been contested with France since 1989; the Ella-Mobbs Trophy (formerly the Cook Cup) with England since 1997; the Hopetoun Cup with Scotland since 1998; the Lansdowne Cup with Ireland since 1999; and the James Bevan Trophy with Wales since 2007.

Below is a summary of the Test Matches played by Australia up until 26 November 2022:

Players

Selection policy
Up until 2015, to be selected for the Wallabies, eligible players had to play for an Australian Super Rugby franchise, and eligible players playing outside of Australia were not able to be selected.

On 16 April 2015, with the 2015 Rugby World Cup approaching, the ARU announced that it would tweak their selection policy, so that certain players could ply their trade in the Japanese Top League competition from August to February, as long as they continued to play for a Super Rugby franchise from February to August, making them eligible for Wallaby selection as they would also be still playing in Australia.

However, this "flexible contract" would only be given to a select number of players considered by the head coach and the ARU board, which means not all players playing or transferring to Japan would be allowed to play in the Top League and the Super Rugby. As the Top League competition clashes with some Wallaby test matches, Wallaby selectors would use World Rugby's regulation 9 (clubs must release players within international windows) to select these players when the Top League clashes with the Rugby Championship in August through to October, and the end-of-year tour in November.

At this point, players playing in Europe were not considered for the flexible contract, as too much of the European season clashes with Wallaby test matches.

However, on 22 April 2015, further changes were made to the original selection policy in order for some European based players to be selected.

In addition to the flexible contract, Australian players playing anywhere in the world can be selected for the Wallabies as long as they fit a certain criteria - A player must have held a professional contract with Australian rugby for at least seven years, and have played 60 tests or more for an overseas based player to be selected.

Further more, if a player does not fit this criteria and plays overseas, but chooses to return to Australia, they become immediately eligible for selection as long as they have signed at least two years with the Australian Super Rugby franchise for the following season. Like the flexible contract, Wallaby selectors would use World Rugby's regulation 9 to select overseas based players anywhere in the world.

Current squad
On 16 October, Dave Rennie named a 36-Man Squad for their 2022 Spring Tour Matches against Scotland, France, Italy, Ireland and Wales.

Head coach:  Eddie Jones
 Caps Updated: 26 November 2022

Notable players

, the Wallabies have fourteen former players (and two former coaches) in the World Rugby Hall of Fame, which was previously known as the IRB Hall of Fame prior to 2015.

Australians in the World Rugby Hall of Fame (year of induction in brackets):

The two World Cup-winning captains, John Eales and Nick Farr-Jones, were among the first Australians to be inducted. Eales received this honour in 2007.
Farr-Jones and another former Wallaby captain, Nick Shehadie, were inducted in 2011. Shehadie was honoured not as a player but recognised, together with fellow Australian Rugby administrator Roger Vanderfield, as one of four key figures in the creation of the Rugby World Cup. World Cup-winning coaches Bob Dwyer and Rod Macqueen were also inducted in 2011.

Six former Wallaby greats with combined playing careers spanning almost nine decades – Tom Lawton Snr, John Thornett, Ken Catchpole, Mark Ella, David Campese and George Gregan – were added to the list of Australians in the IRB Hall of Fame in 2013.

Lawton, a fly-half whose international career spanned from 1920 to 1932, was noted for his ball-handling and kicking skills, and most notably led Australia to their first-ever clean sweep of the Bledisloe Cup series, in 1929. Thornett, a forward who played in four different positions for the Wallabies, made his international debut in 1955. He earned 35 caps in a 12-year Test career, and captained the Wallabies 15 times. During Australia's drawn 1963 Test series against South Africa, in which he served as captain, the Wallabies became the first team in the 20th century to win consecutive Tests over the Springboks.

Gregan, a World Cup-winning scrum-half whose Test career spanned the amateur and professional eras of the sport (1994–2007), is notable as having been the all-time caps leader in international rugby union, with 139 in all (a record since surpassed by Brian O'Driscoll of Ireland). He also captained the Wallabies in 59 Tests.

A further two World Cup winners, Michael Lynagh and Tim Horan, were inducted in 2014 and 2015 respectively when the separate New Zealand-based International Rugby Hall of Fame was merged with the IRB's Hall of Fame.

Wallabies and Olympic gold medallists from the 1908 tour of the United Kingdom, Tom Richards and Daniel Carroll, were honoured with inductions in 2015 and 2016. Both of these men went on to become dual internationals in rugby with Richards playing for the 1910 British Lions and Carroll winning further Olympic gold playing for United States in 1920. Both men also received awards for gallantry during their military service in World War I.

Fly-half Stephen Larkham, a World Cup winner in 1999 and renowned for his drop goal to beat South Africa in the semi-final of that tournament, was admitted to the World Rugby Hall of Fame in 2018.

Individual records

Former captain George Gregan is Australia's most capped player with 139 Test caps. Gregan was also the world's most capped player until being surpassed by Ireland's Brian O'Driscoll in 2014. Gregan also equalled the record for the most caps as captain with Will Carling, 59 caps (a record later to be broken by John Smit of South Africa). David Campese scored 64 Test tries in his career, which was a world record until Daisuke Ohata of Japan overtook him with 69 tries, and Michael Lynagh was the highest Test points scorer in world rugby with 911 until Neil Jenkins of Wales overtook him with 1037 points. Rocky Elsom scored the fastest forward hat-trick in World Cup history. Australia's most-capped forward is lock Nathan Sharpe, who retired from international rugby after the 2012 end-of-year Tests with 116 caps.

The longest winning streak by Australia was produced in the early 1990s, and started at the 1991 World Cup in England, with three pool wins, and subsequent quarter-final and semi-final victories over Ireland and the All Blacks respectively. This was followed by the win over England in the final. The streak continued into the following year, for two matches against Scotland and the All Blacks, lasting in total, 10 games. Similarly, the Australian record for losses in a row is also 10 games, which was sustained from a period from 1899 to 1907, including two British Isles tours, and losses to the All Blacks.

The largest winning margin for Australia was produced at the 2003 World Cup, in which they defeated Namibia 142 points to nil during the pool stages, the match is also the largest number of points scored by Australia. The largest loss was against South Africa, who beat Australia 53–8 in 2008.

Coaches

The current Head Coach is Eddie Jones who was appointed in January 2023, following the sacking of Dave Rennie. Jones returned to Australian rugby 18 year after first coaching the Wallabies between 2001 and 2005.

Prior to 1982, Australia did not select coaches as long-term appointments. Managers were appointed to handle the logistics of overseas tours and the assistant manager often doubled as the coach for the duration of the trip. Sometimes the team captain filled the Australian coaching role, particularly for home tests since the IRB had ruled that home teams could not be assembled until three days before a test match.

Home grounds

The Wallabies play at a variety of stadiums around Australia. Some of these include Stadium Australia in Sydney, Lang Park in Brisbane, AAMI Park and Docklands Stadium in Melbourne, and Optus Stadium and nib Stadium in Perth.

A variety of venues were used around Australia for the 2003 Rugby World Cup matches.

Some of the earlier stadiums that were traditionally used for Wallabies matches, included Sydney's Concord Oval and the Sydney Cricket Ground (SCG) and Sports Ground, as well as Ballymore and the Exhibition Ground in Brisbane. It was the SCG that hosted the first ever Australian international, against Great Britain, in 1899.

Broadcasters
The Wallabies rugby internationals and spring tour were televised by ABC from 1957 to 1991, Network Ten between 1992 and 1995 and again from 2013 to 2021. They jointly televised them with Seven Network between 1996–2010 and the Nine Network in 2011–2012. Fox Sports has also televised the team since 1996.

From 2021, Wallabies games will be broadcast by the Nine Network and their online streaming service Stan.

Wallabies internationals held in Australia and New Zealand, as well as at the Rugby World Cup, are protected by Australia's anti-siphoning laws, meaning that all Wallabies matches must be offered to a free-to-air network.

Sponsorship 
In April 2015, BMW Australia became the official partner of the Australian Rugby Union (ARU). Signed as the official vehicle partner, two-year deal that extends until the end of 2016 establishes BMW Australia as sponsors for the Wallabies and the ARU.

The partnership agreement extends BMW's involvement with the game globally, having an established relationship with the English Rugby Football Union as a vehicle partner since 2012.

See also

 Australia A national rugby union team
 Australia national rugby sevens team
 Australia women's national rugby union team
 List of Australia national rugby union team records
 List of Australia national rugby union team test match results
 Wallaby Team of the Decade

Notes

Notes

Bibliography

External links

 
 Australian rugby union Wallaby Hall of Fame
 Australian rugby union news from Planet Rugby
 

 
Oceanian national rugby union teams